Nuclear Physics and Atomic Energy is a quarterly peer-reviewed open-access scientific journal published by Institute for Nuclear Research of the National Academy of Sciences of Ukraine. It was established in 2000 and covers all aspects of nuclear physics, particle physics, atomic energy, radiation physics, plasma physics, radiobiology, radioecology, technique and experimental methods. The editor-in-chief is V.I. Slisenko (Institute for Nuclear Research). Articles are published in English, Ukrainian or Russian with titles and abstracts in all three languages.

Abstracting and indexing
The journal is abstracted and indexed in Scopus.

References

External links

Quarterly journals
Multilingual journals
Nuclear physics journals
Particle physics journals
Plasma science journals
Publications established in 2002